Psyche was an online peer-reviewed academic journal covering studies on consciousness and its relation to the brain from perspectives provided by the disciplines of cognitive science, philosophy, psychology, physics, neuroscience, artificial intelligence, and anthropology. It was established in 1993. In 2008 it became the official journal of the Association for the Scientific Study of Consciousness. Psyche is no longer accepting articles, but the archive remains accessible.

External links
 Psyche website and archive of issues 1994–2010
 Official website of the ASSC

Biannual journals
Cognitive science journals
Consciousness studies
English-language journals
Publications disestablished in 2010
Publications established in 1994